Step Lively may refer to:

 Step lively (phrase), a phrase historically used by New York streetcar and subway conductors and pushers
 Step Lively (1917 film), a comedy short starring Harold Lloyd
 Step Lively (1944 film), a musical starring Frank Sinatra
 Step Lively (album), a 1981 album by Jo Jo Zep & The Falcons

See also
 Step Lively, Jeeves!, a 1937 American comedy film